A flood-meadow (or floodmeadow) is an area of grassland or pasture beside a river, subject to seasonal flooding. Flood-meadows are distinct from water-meadows in that the latter are artificially created and maintained, with flooding controlled on a seasonal and even daily basis.

Examples 

Austria:
 Hohenau an der March
Bosnia and Herzegovina:
 List of karst polje in Bosnia and Herzegovina
Estonia:
 Emajõe flood-meadow
 Kasari, Matsalu National Park
Finland:
 Mattholmsfladan, Pargas
 Levänluhta, Isokyrö
Ireland:
 Shannon Callows
United Kingdom:
 Angel & Greyhound Meadow, Oxford
 Christchurch Meadows, Reading
 Christ Church Meadow, Oxford
 Mill Meadows, Henley-on-Thames
 Port Meadow, Oxford
 Mottey Meadows, Staffordshire
 Riverside Park, St Neots, Cambridgeshire

References

See also 

Coastal plain
Field
Flooded grasslands and savannas
Plain
Prairie
Riparian zone
Wet meadow
Floodplain
Berm

 
Riparian zone
Meadows
Rivers
Environmental terminology
Water and the environment